Chloephorinae is a subfamily of the moth family Nolidae. It includes, among others, many of the moths known as silver-lines. They are rather similar to some owlet moths (Noctuidae) in appearance and often colored a vivid green, but may also be brown, grey, or white.

Genera incertae sedis
In addition to the about 55 genera assigned to tribes, there are some additional ones of undetermined relationships:

Acachmena Turner, 1908
Apothriguna Berio, 1962
Armactica Walker, 1865
Austrocarea Holloway, 1977
Autanthema Warren, 1912
Beara Walker, 1866
Chlorozada Hampson, 1912
Clethrophora Hampson, 1894
Clytophylla Turner, 1929
Dilophothripoides Strand, 1917
Erizada Walker, 1865
Gabala Walker, [1866]
Gelastocera Butler, 1877
Hylophilodes Hampson, 1912
Iscadia Walker, 1857
Labanda Walker, 1859
Lobocraspis Hampson, 1895
Lophocrama Hampson, 1912
Maceda Walker, 1857
Macrobarasa Hampson, 1912
Macrochthonia Butler, 1881
Metaleptina Holland, 1893
Microthripa Hampson, 1912
Microzada Hampson, 1912
Negeta Walker, 1862
Neonegeta Hampson, 1912
Paraxestis Hampson, 1902
Pardoxia Vives Moreno & González Prada, 1981
Plagerepne Tams, 1926
Plectothripa Hampson, 1918
Plusiocalpe Holland, 1894
Pterogonia C. Swinhoe, 1891
Ptisciana Walker, 1865
Thriponea Hulstaert, 1924
Titulcia Walker, 1864
Tornoconia Berio, 1966
Tortriciforma Hampson, 1894
Tyana Walker, 1866
Tympanistes Moore, 1867
Urbona Walker, 1862
Vizaga C. Swinhoe, 1901
Xanthodes Guenée, 1852
Xenochroa Felder, 1874

References